Enemy Inside is a heavy metal band founded in Aschaffenburg, Germany in 2017.

Background 
The band was formed by singer Nastassja Giulia and guitar player Evan K (Mystic Prophecy, Exit Eden, ex-Cypecore) who have found their own sound, somewhere between dark rock and modern metal, through a wide range of musical experimentation. Their music strikes hard guitar riffs with melodic vocals and melodic guitar solos.

In June 2018, Enemy Inside announced their debut album Phoenix to be released by ROAR in September 2018.

In August 2018, the band released their first singles & video clips "Falling Away", "Oblivion" and "Lullaby" on YouTube.

Georg Neuhauser, the singer of the symphonic/progressive power metal band Serenity, appears also as a guest and performs alongside Giulia on the song "Doorway to Salvation". The album reached after few days of its release Nr.28 in the German iTunes Metal Top releases and Nr.74 in the US.

In August 2021 the band has released its second album "Seven" and reached #93 of the German Downloadscharts and was positioned within the Top Releases in many countries.

Band members 
Current members
Nastassja Giulia - lead vocals (2017-present)
Evan K - lead guitar (2017-present) (Mystic Prophecy, Exit Eden)
David Hadarick - rhythm guitar (2017-present)
Dominik Stotzem - bass guitar (2017-present) (ex-Beyond The Bridge)
Fabian Dührssen - drums (2022-present)
Former members
 Felix Keith - drums (2017-2021) (ex-Aloha from Hell)

Discography 
Singles
 Falling Away (2018)
 Oblivion (2018)
 Lullaby (2018)
 Phoenix (2019)
 Dark Skies (2019)
 Doorway to Salvation (2019)
 Crystallize (2021)
 Alien (2021)
 Release Me (2021)
 Black Butterfly (2021)
 In My Blood (2021)

Studio albums
 Phoenix (2018)
 Seven (2021)

Videography 
Dark Skies (2019)
Phoenix (2019)
Doorway To Salvation (2019)
Falling Away (2018)
Oblivion (2018)
Lullaby (2018)
Crystallize (2021)
Alien (2021)
Release Me (2021)
Black Butterfly (2021)
In My Blood (2021)

References

External links 

Dark rock groups
German heavy metal musical groups
German rock music groups
Alternative metal musical groups